The Ivy Rugby Conference is a rugby union conference consisting of the eight member schools of the Ivy League. It was formed in 2009 to foster better competition among rugby teams from the Ivy League schools and to raise the quality of play. Ivy Rugby formed committees to manage the league, independently of the LAUs and TUs. The conference took over the organization of the Ivy rugby championships that had been contested since 1969.

The Ivy Rugby Conference, and specifically its sevens tournament, has enabled the Ivy schools to tap into existing rivalries and fan bases.

Ivy Rugby has had some past success in attracting commercial sponsors. Sponsors have included H2H, Royall Lyme and Boathouse Sports.

The Ivy League schools have a rich rugby tradition that pre-dates the formation of the Ivy conference. Teams in the Ivy League have played rugby games against each other since the mid 1870s and starting in 2024 will be celebrating the 150th anniversary of such rugby games. 

The eight Ivy League schools competed in the Ivy Rugby Championship Tournament from 1969 until the Ivy Rugby Conference was formed in 2009. The Ivy Rugby logo was developed in 2005.

In addition to the traditional 15-a-side rugby union competition, the teams play yearly for the Ivy Rugby 7s Championship held the first Saturday in November.

Member Schools

Championship results 
Historic results of the Ivy Rugby Championship, organised by the Ivy Rugby Conference since 2009:

7s championship results

References

External links
 

 
College rugby union competitions in the United States
2009 establishments in the United States
Sports organizations established in 2009